Polichnitos is a town and a former municipality on the island of Lesbos, North Aegean, Greece. Since the 2019 local government reform it is part of the municipality West Lesbos, of which it is a municipal unit. Population 4,234 (2001). The municipal unit is located in the central south coast of the island, adjacent to the south side of the Bay of Kalloni. It has a land area of 172.629 km2. Its municipal seat is in the town of Polichnítos (pop. 2,102). The next largest villages are Vrísa (617), Vasiliká (400), and Lisvóri (408).

References

External links
Local website 

Populated places in Lesbos